Bacteriochlorophylls (BChl) are photosynthetic pigments that occur in various phototrophic bacteria. They were discovered by C. B. van Niel in 1932. They are related to chlorophylls, which are the primary pigments in plants, algae, and cyanobacteria. Organisms that contain bacteriochlorophyll conduct photosynthesis to sustain their energy requirements, but do not produce oxygen as a byproduct. They use wavelengths of light not absorbed by plants or cyanobacteria.

Structure 

Bacteriochlorophylls a, b, and g are bacteriochlorins, meaning their molecules have a bacteriochlorin macrocycle ring with two reduced pyrrole rings (B and D). Bacteriochlorophylls c, d, e, and f are chlorins, meaning their molecules have a chlorin macrocycle ring with one reduced pyrrole ring (D).

Bacteriochlorophylls c to f occur in the form of closely related homologs with different alkyl groups attached to pyrrole rings B and C and are illustrated above in their simplest versions, esterified with the sesquiterpene alcohol farnesol. Most of the variation occurs in the 8 and 12 positions and can be attributed to methyltransferase variation. BChl cS is a term for 8-ethyl,12-methyl homolog of BChl c.

Bacteriochlorophyll g has a vinyl group in ring (A), at position 8.

Biosynthesis
 
There are a large number of known bacteriochlorophylls but all have features in common since the biosynthetic pathway involves chlorophyllide a (Chlide a) as an intermediate.

Chlorin-cored BChls (c to f) are produced by a series of enzymatic modifications on the sidechain of Chlide a, much like how Chl b, d, e are made. The bacteriochlorin-cored BChls a, b, g require a unique step to reduce the double bound between C7 and C8, which is performed by Chlorophyllide a reductase (COR).

Isobacteriochlorins, in contrast, are biosynthesised from uroporphyrinogen III in a separate pathway that leads, for example, to siroheme, cofactor F430 and cobalamin. The common intermediate is sirohydrochlorin.

References 

Photosynthetic pigments
Tetrapyrroles

de:Chlorophylle#Chemische Struktur bei anoxygenen Phototrophen: Bakteriochlorophylle (Bchl)